Family Feud Africa is a South African game show produced by BBC African Rapid Blue and American Steve Harvey Global, distributed by Fremantle, broadcast on e.tv, starting from April 5, 2020. It is the South African version of the American show of the same name, and was filmed after Season 21 of the current United States version (which started in 1999) was completed, in December 2019.  Fremantle offered selected production staffers and host Steve Harvey for the production.

The show's logo is based on the logo from the first seven seasons (1999–2006) of the current US version, with the set based on the 2010 version.  The show uses both the 1976 and 1988 variants of "The Feud" composed Walt Levinsky music cues, and for round-winning or Fast Money-winning situations, the Edd Kalehoff–composed versions used by the 1994–95 Richard Dawson version is used instead.  The graphics come from the 2014 Australian version. Unlike the United States version, there is product placement from KFC South Africa franchisee (a practice usually prohibited on United States game shows following the quiz show scandals).

For Season 2 (2021), the podiums were changed to reflect the changes to the set in August 2020.

Gameplay
Similar to the pre-1992 United States rules, families win money based on their main game score. The first and second rounds are single, the third and fourth are double, and the fifth round is for triple money. Both families earn R50 per point with the higher scoring family playing Fast Money for R75,000, with a loss earning the family R150 per point.

Other versions
A Ghanaian version is also produced in South Africa, and is broadcast on TV3 Ghana, also with Steve Harvey at the helm.  Australian rules are used (four players per family) with only four rounds (double money in round three and triple in round four), and the family leading after four rounds plays Fast Money for $5,000. Both families receive $5 per point and A Fast Money loss awards $15 per point.

Another Tunisian version of the show is also being produced in Tunisia hosted by Karim El Gharbi and broadcast on El Hiwar El Tounsi while the rules are the same as the U.S. version, however, the name is different due to it being translated as "Malla Twensa - ملاّ توانسة" in Tunisian Arabic dialect.
Season 1 first episode was aired on Tuesday October 13, 2020.

References 

Family Feud
South African game shows
2020 South African television series debuts